Battle of Martinići was the battle between Montenegrins and Pashalik of Scutari which took place on the outskirts of the village Martinići, near Spuž, Montenegro.

Following the unification of Montenegro with Brda, the Ottoman governor of the Pashalik of Scutari launched a military offensive onto Montenegrin territory. Two Montenegrin divisions, led by Prince-bishop Petar I Petrović-Njegoš and guvernadur Jovan Radonjić, containing 3,000 men, took positions near Martinići. The Ottomans advanced towards Martinići from Spuž with 18,000 men, fighting guerilla resistance for nine days, before launching an assault on Montenegrin positions on 11 July. Montenegrins counter-attacked and the Ottomans suffered significant casualties.

The result of this victory, followed by another victory at Krusi was the unification of Piperi and Bjelopavlići clan regions, previously occupied by the Ottoman Empire, with Montenegro.

See also
Battle of Krusi
Battle of Lopate

References
 Pavićević, Branko, O prvom pohodu Mahmuta Bušatlije na Crnu Goru, Istoriski časopis, Belgrade, 1956, pp. 153–167.
 Vojna Enciklopedija, Belgrade, 1973, knjiga peta, pp. 316.

Martinici
Martinici
Martinici
Martinici
1796 in Europe
1796 in the Ottoman Empire
Prince-Bishopric of Montenegro
Martinići